Interstellar Rodeo was an annual three-day outdoor music event held the last weekend of July in Edmonton, Alberta, Canada, established in 2012 and held at the Heritage Amphitheatre within Hawrelak Park. From 2015 to 2017, Six Shooter Records also had an Interstellar Rodeo in Winnipeg, Manitoba. The final Edmonton Interstellar Rodeo was in 2019.

The festival showcases performers from numerous genres. Notable performers to date include Blue Rodeo, Randy Newman and Hawksley Workman in 2012, and Alabama Shakes, Steve Earle and the Dukes, Sarah Harmer, Serena Ryder and Shout Out Out Out Out in 2013.

History 
Interstellar Rodeo was established in 2012 by Shauna de Cartier of Six Shooter Records. The event took place annually during the last weekend of July at the Heritage Amphitheatre at Hawrelak Park in the North Saskatchewan River Valley. The amphitheatre features covered seating with uncovered grassed areas beyond. Interstellar Rodeo featured artist-wine pairings.

In 2019, festival passes cost between 149 and 279 dollars.

In 2014, Interstellar Rodeo was shut down for one day due to poor weather. The 2019 Festival was shut down for approximately one hour on July 27 due to severe thunderstorms in eastern Alberta. In late 2019, de Cartier announced the festival would be going on hiatus and not returning for summer 2020.

Interstellar Rodeo Winnipeg 

From 2015 to 2017, Interstellar Rodeo expanded to Winnipeg, Manitoba. The Winnipeg festival took place at The Forks in mid-August. The festival line-up typically featured some overlap with the Edmonton festival but with the addition of Manitoba-based artists such as Leonard Sumner. The festival dropped out of Winnipeg due to financial concerns from competing with free concert series in Winnipeg such as the Canada Summer Games concerts in 2017.

Performers 
2015

 Sinead O’Connor
 Dwight Yoakam
 Blue Rodeo
 Vance Joy
 Steve Earle and The Dukes
 Sharon Jones and The Dap-Kings
 July Talk
 Hawksley Workman
 Tanya Tagaq
 Justin Townes Earle
 Rhiannon Giddens
 The Lone Bellow
 Black Joe Lewis
 Elliott Brood
 NQ Arbuckle
 Amelia Curran
 Jason Plumb & The Willing

2016

 Blond(e) Goth
 The Strumbellas
 Nathaniel Rateliff & The Night Sweats
 NQ Arbuckle
 Serena Ryder
 The Wet Secrets
 Thao & The Get Down Stay Down
 Leonard Sumner
 Skydiggers
 Fantastic Negrito
 Sykamore
 Margo Price
 Joe Nolan
 Wilco
 Henry Wagons
 Sam Outlaw
 Begonia
 Wintersleep
 Lee Fields & The Expressions
 Henri Herbert
 Whitehorse
 Del Barber
 Case/Lang/Veirs

2017

 Aloe Blacc
 Sarah Slean
 Danny Michel
 The Dead South
 Yola Carter
 Shakey Graves
 Beck
 Broken Social Scene
 Father John Misty

List of artists

2012 (July 27–29)
The Beauties
Alejandro Escovedo and The Sensitive Boys1
Blue Rodeo
Richard Buckner
Cadence Weapon
Carolina Chocolate Drops
Jenn Grant
Randy Newman
Michael Rault Band
Jason Plumb and The Willing
Shakura S'Aida
The Sojourners
Wagons
Gillian Welch1
Whitehorse (featuring Melissa McClelland and Luke Doucet)
Hawksley Workman

1Sinéad O’Connor, originally booked, was unable to perform due to illness and was replaced by Alejandro Escovedo and The Sensitive Boys and Gillian Welch.

2013 (July 26–28)
Alabama Shakes
C.R. Avery
Del Barber
Amelia Curran
The Deep Dark Woods
Steve Earle and The Dukes
Elliott Brood
John Fullbright
The Good Lovelies
Sarah Harmer
Interstellar All-Stars, featuring Jim Cuddy, Danny Michel and Quique Escamilla
Jr. Gone Wild
Danny Michel with The Garifuna Collective
Mike Plume
Serena Ryder
Rachel Sermanni
Shout Out Out Out Out
Skydiggers
Kurt Vile
M. Ward
Chris Wynters and Scott Peters

See also

List of festivals in Edmonton
List of festivals in Alberta
List of music festivals in Canada

References

External links

Folk festivals in Canada
Music festivals in Edmonton
Recurring events established in 2012
2012 establishments in Alberta